Mark Liburkin (Vitebsk, 31 August 1910 - Moscow, 5 March 1953) was a Soviet chess composer. He composed more than 110 endgame studies, usually with geometrical motifs. In 1945, he was appointed editor of Soviet chess magazine Shakhmaty v SSSR. In 2010, endgame association AVRES held centenary memorial tournaments in honor of Liburkin and Shaya Kozlowski.

References 

Soviet chess writers
Chess composers